Plano Balloon Festival is held each September at Oak Point Park and Nature Preserve in the city of Plano, Texas. It is one of the city's largest celebrations, drawing in excess of 90,000 attendees.  Celebrating 40 years of its existence, the festival has evolved into an important fundraiser for local nonprofit organizations. InTouch Credit Union is the festival's main sponsor. 

The events at the festival vary somewhat from year to year. A typical schedule includes five hot air balloon launches (weather permitting) a large Kids Fun Zone, a stage showcasing local community acts, live bands Friday and Saturday night, sky divers, fireworks, and balloon night glows. A balloon glow takes place after dusk when balloon pilots assemble with their equipment on the balloon launch field and conduct synchronized firings of their balloon's burners.  Weather may alter the performance of events, either by preventing or delaying a particular performance or by eliminating some element of the performance. 

The festival was cancelled in 2018 due to heavy rains and flooding. It was also cancelled in 2020 and 2021 from the  COVID-19 pandemic. It returned September 22-25, 2022.

See also
 Hot air balloon festivals

References

External links 

Plano Balloon Festival

Hot air balloon festivals in the United States
Plano, Texas
Festivals in Texas
Tourist attractions in Collin County, Texas